Judge Sweeney may refer to:

Charlotte Sweeney (born 1969), judge of the United States District Court for the District of Colorado
George Clinton Sweeney (1895–1966), judge of the United States District Court for the District of Massachusetts
James R. Sweeney II (born 1961), judge of the United States District Court for the Southern District of Indiana
Margaret M. Sweeney (born 1955), judge of the United States Court of Federal Claims

See also
Justice Sweeney (disambiguation)